The 2006–07 TFF League A (also known as Türk Telekom Lig A due to sponsoring reasons) was the second-level football league of Turkey and the 44th season since its establishment in 1963–64. At the end of the season in which 18 teams competed in a single group, Gençlerbirliği OFTAŞ and İstanbul B.B., which finished the league in the first two places, and the play-off winner Kasımpaşa were promoted to the upper league, while Türk Telekom, Akçaabat Sebatspor and Uşakspor, which were in the last three places, were relegated.

Final standings

Results

Promotion play-offs

Promotion play-offs were organized in 19 Mayıs Stadium in Ankara between May 27 and May 30

Top goalscorers

References 

 

TFF First League seasons
Turkey
1